Obongsan is a mountain of North Korea. It has an elevation of 1,264 metres. It stands between Kumgang and Kosong County in Kangwon Province.

See also
List of mountains of Korea

References

Mountains of North Korea